The Soldatov's gudgeon (Gobio soldatovi) is a species of gudgeon, a small freshwater in the family Cyprinidae. It is found in Asia in the Amur River drainage in Russia and China, on the Sakhalin Island, and in Lake Buir in Mongolia. It is a demersal fish, up to 12.0 cm long.

Named in honor of ichthyologist Vladimir Konstantinovich Soldatov (1875–1941), who collected type specimen.

References

 

Gobio
Fish described in 1914
Cyprinid fish of Asia
Fish of East Asia
Freshwater fish of China
Fish of Russia
Fish of Mongolia
Fauna of Siberia
Taxa named by Lev Berg